Gabriel Riera Lancha (born 5 June 1985) is an Andorran footballer who plays for UE Engordany in the Andorran First Division and Andorra national football team.

International goals
Updated 28 September 2014.

|-
|| 1. || 4 June 2005 || U Nisy Stadion, Liberec, Czech Republic ||  || 3–1 || 8–1 || 2006 FIFA World Cup qualification
|}

References

External links

Gabi Riera at La Preferente

1985 births
Living people
Andorran footballers
Andorra international footballers
Andorran expatriate footballers
FC Andorra players
Cádiz CF B players
UE Sant Julià players
FC Rànger's players
Association football forwards
CE Principat players
CF Gimnástico Alcázar players
UE Santa Coloma players
FC Santa Coloma players
UE Engordany players
Andorran expatriate sportspeople in Spain
Expatriate footballers in Spain